Debre Marqos Airport is an airport at Debre Marqos, Ethiopia .

References
Ethiopian Airlines Routes

Airports in Ethiopia
Debre Markos